George Garrett Judge (born May 2, 1925) is an American econometrician and Professor in the Graduate School in the Department of Agricultural and Resource Economics in the UC Berkeley College of Natural Resources.

Biography 
Judge was born on a farm in Nicholas, Kentucky on Mary 2, 1925. During World War II, he served on Saipan Island, flying B-29 missions over Japan. After the war he attended the University of Kentucky, earning his bachelor's degree in Agricultural Economics in 1948. Judge went on to earn his PhD in economics and statistics from Iowa State University, and became an Assistant Professor at the University of Connecticut in 1951; a full Professor at Oklahoma State University in 1955;
and (after a visit at Yale) moved to the University of Illinois, where he remained until 1986, when he moved to the Department of Agricultural and Resource Economics at the University of California, Berkeley, where he remains active to this day.

Contributions 
Judge has published over 150 articles in research journals.  His work has spanned many research questions in econometrics, including the estimation of parameters for a Markov probability model from time series data; inference from spatial and temporal price and allocation models; and application of information theory to recover systematic behavior from noisy data.  Judge has written a number of foundational textbooks in econometrics that have been widely used by graduate students in econometrics since the 1970s.

Notable publications 
 An Information Theoretic Approach to Econometrics, 2011 (with Ron C. Mittelhammer)
 Econometric Foundations, 2000 (with Ron C. Mittelhammer and Douglas J. Miller)

Fellowships and honors 
 Fellow of the Econometric Society
 Fellow of the Journal of Econometrics
 Fellow of the American Agricultural Economics Association

References 

1925 births
Living people
American economists
Fellows of the Econometric Society
United States Army Air Forces personnel of World War II
University of California, Berkeley College of Natural Resources faculty